Benj Pasek (born June 6, 1985) is an American theater and television composer and lyricist best known for his works The Greatest Showman, La La Land and Dear Evan Hansen, all of which he co-wrote with his songwriting partner, Justin Paul.

Early life and education
Pasek was born into a Jewish family in Philadelphia, Pennsylvania. His mother was a teacher who wrote children's songs, which got him interested in music. As a child, he sang with the Philadelphia Boys Choir & Chorale. He went on to earn a B.F.A. in musical theater from the University of Michigan. It was there that he met Justin Paul. When Pasek and Paul were unsatisfied with the roles they were getting in the shows at the university, the two decided to begin writing their own shows. One of the first projects they worked on together, Edges was developed at the school.

Career
Pasek and Paul won the Jonathan Larson Grant in 2007. The two co-wrote and co-composed the musical Dogfight, which opened Off-Broadway at the Second Stage Theatre in July 2012. The pair went on to write music and lyrics for James and the Giant Peach, A Christmas Story: The Musical, Dear Evan Hansen, and The Greatest Showman. Pasek also collaborated with Paul on lyrics for the film La La Land (music by Justin Hurwitz). They have also written songs for the television shows Smash and The Flash. Most recently the duo wrote the original songs for Apple Original Films's Spirited, starring Will Ferrell and Ryan Reynolds.

References 

1985 births
American composers
University of Michigan alumni
Living people
American lyricists
American theatre people
People from Philadelphia
Musicians from Philadelphia
Musicians from Pennsylvania